The following is a list of works by science fiction author Kevin J. Anderson.

Standalone
Resurrection, Inc. (1988)
Climbing Olympus (1994)
Blindfold (1995)
Fantastic Voyage: Microcosm (2001)
Hopscotch (2002)
The Dragon Business (2013)
Stake (2020)

Star Wars expanded universe
Darksaber (1996)

The Jedi Academy trilogy
Jedi Search (1994)
Dark Apprentice (1994)
Champions of the Force (1994)

Comic books series
Dark Lords of the Sith (1994–95)
The Sith War (1995–96)
Golden Age of the Sith (1996–97)
The Fall of the Sith Empire (1997)
Redemption (1998)

Young Jedi Knights series (with Rebecca Moesta)
Heirs of the Force (1995)
Shadow Academy (1995)
The Lost Ones (1995)
Lightsabers (1996)
Darkest Knight (1996)
Jedi Under Siege (1996)
Shards of Alderaan (1997)
Diversity Alliance (1997)
Delusions of Grandeur (1997)
Jedi Bounty (1997)
The Emperor's Plague (1997)
Return to Ord Mantell (1998)
Trouble on Cloud City (1998)
Crisis at Crystal Reef (1998)

Short story anthologies edited by Anderson
Tales from the Mos Eisley Cantina (1995)
Tales from Jabba's Palace (1996)
Tales of the Bounty Hunters (1996)

Reference works
The Illustrated Star Wars Universe (1995)
The Essential Chronology with Daniel Wallace (2000)
The New Essential Chronology (original text only)

The X-Files books
Ground Zero (1995) 
Ruins (1996) 
Antibodies (1997)

Dune books
(all with Brian Herbert)

Dune prequel series

Prelude to Dune
Dune: House Atreides (1999)
Dune: House Harkonnen (2000)
Dune: House Corrino (2001)

Legends of Dune
Dune: The Butlerian Jihad (2002)
Dune: The Machine Crusade (2003)
Dune: The Battle of Corrin (2004)

Heroes of Dune
Paul of Dune (2008)
The Winds of Dune (2009)
The Throne of Dune (TBD) (Originally titled Irulan of Dune but now currently on hold)
Leto of Dune (TBD) (Title may have changed to Golden Path of Dune but now currently on hold)

Great Schools of Dune
Sisterhood of Dune (2012)
Mentats of Dune (2014)
Navigators of Dune (2016)

The Caladan Trilogy
Dune: The Duke of Caladan (2020)
Dune: The Lady of Caladan (2021)
Dune: The Heir of Caladan (2022)

Dune 7
Hunters of Dune (2006)
Sandworms of Dune (2007)

Short stories
"Dune: A Whisper of Caladan Seas"
"Dune: Hunting Harkonnens"
"Dune: Whipping Mek"
"Dune: The Faces of a Martyr"
"Dune: Sea Child"
"Dune: Treasure in the Sand"
"Blood of the Sardaukar: A Tale of Dune" (in Unfettered III)

Companion book
(also with Frank Herbert)
The Road to Dune (2005)

The Saga of Seven Suns series

The Saga of Seven Suns
Prequel: Veiled Alliances (Graphic novel) (2004)
 Hidden Empire (2002)
 A Forest of Stars (2003)
 Horizon Storms (2004; (P) and (C) 1998 Simon & Schuster)
 Scattered Suns (2005)
 Of Fire and Night (2006)
 Metal Swarm  (2007)
 The Ashes of Worlds (2008)

The Saga of Shadows trilogy
(Sequel trilogy to The Saga of Seven Suns)
Prequel: Whistling Past the Graveyard (2016)
 The Dark Between the Stars (2014)
 Blood of the Cosmos (2015)
 Eternity's Mind (2016)

Dan Shamble, Zombie P.I. series
Death Warmed Over (September 1, 2012)
Unnatural Acts (January 1, 2013)
Hair Raising (May 2013)
Slimy Underbelly (September 2014)
Working Stiff (short story collection, October 2014)
Tastes Like Chicken (November 2017)
Services Rendered (October 2018)

Other series

Gamearth Trilogy
 Gamearth (March 1989)
 Gameplay (October 1989)
 Game's End (September 1990)
(Republished as Hexworld Trilogy in 2021)

Terra Incognita series
The Edge of the World (2009)
The Map of All Things (2010)
The Key to Creation (2011)

A trilogy about two countries, Uraba and Tierra, at war with each other. It is set in a world similar to early modern Europe, impacted by such inventions as gunpowder and hot air balloons and by the discovery of hitherto unknown lands and oceans, both countries exploring the world in order to gain an upper hand against the other. One goal is to find the sacred land of Terravitae. However, the fanatic religious war, with each country believing its religion to be the only correct one and the other's a blasphemous heresy and engaging in an escalating series of atrocities, is reminiscent of an earlier historical period, that of the Crusades with its struggle between Medieval Christianity and Islam. The series' Holy City of Ishalem, sacred to both religions and which both kingdoms are utterly determined to possess at all costs, is reminiscent of  Medieval attitudes to Jerusalem.

Anderson and ProgRock Records owner and musician Shawn Gordon created a crossover project called Roswell Six and released the album "Terra Incognita: Beyond The Horizon" with Erik Norlander for book 1 and "Terra Incognita: A Line In The Sand" with Henning Pauly. They combine progressive rock/metal with science fiction lyrics by Anderson and his wife.

Wake the Dragon series 
 Spine of the Dragon (2019)
 Vengewar (2021)
 Gods and Dragons (TBA)

Hexworld Trilogy
(Republished from Gamearth Trilogy)
 Roll (2021)
 Play (2021)
 End (2021)

Pseudonyms

As K. J. Anderson 

 Captain Nemo: The Fantastic History of a Dark Genius (2002) (a fictional life of Jules Verne's Captain Nemo)
The League of Extraordinary Gentlemen – novelization of the 2003 movie
Sky Captain and the World of Tomorrow – novelization of the 2004 movie

Other pseudonyms

The Siege of the Tower (Endless Quest) with Rebecca Moesta (1994) (as Kem Antilles)
Highest Score (Star Trek: Deep Space Nine) with Rebecca Moesta (1996) (as Kem Antilles)
StarCraft: Shadow of the Xel'Naga (2001) (as Gabriel Mesta)
The Martian War (2005) (as Gabriel Mesta)

Collaborations

With Doug Beason 

Lifeline (1990)
The Trinity Paradox (1991)
Assemblers of Infinity (1993)
Ill Wind (1995)
Ignition (1996)
Fallout (1997)
Kill Zone (2019)

Craig Kreident series 

 Virtual Destruction (1996)
 Fallout (1997)
 Lethal Exposure (1998)

With Rebecca Moesta

Crystal Doors series 

Island Realm (2006)
Ocean Realm (2007)
Sky Realm (2008)

Star Challengers series

Moonbase Crisis (2010)
Space Station Crisis (2011)
Asteroid Crisis (2011)

With Brian Herbert

Hellhole trilogy 

Hellhole (2011)
Hellhole Awakening (2013)
Hellhole Inferno (2014)

Other collaborations 

Dean Koontz's Frankenstein, Book One: Prodigal Son with Dean Koontz (2005). Subsequent printings removed Anderson's name from the cover.
Tau Ceti (The Stellar Guild series), with Steven Savile (2011).
Clockwork Angels with Neil Peart (2012) — Novelization of Rush's 20th studio album of the same name.
Ai! Pedrito, utilizing materials by L. Ron Hubbard (1998).
Slan Hunter, utilizing materials by A. E. van Vogt (2007).
Clockwork Lives with Neil Peart (2015) - a follow-up to Clockwork Angels.

Comics

JSA Strange Adventures #1–6 – 2005, DC Comics
Kolchak: The Night Stalker and Dan Shamble, Zombie P.I.: Unnaturally Normal (with Richard Dean Starr (Moonstone Books, 2016)

DC Comics Novels 

The Last Days of Krypton (2007)
Enemies & Allies: The Dark Knight Meets the Man of Steel (2009)

Edited volumes
He has also edited anthologies including:
 War of the Worlds: Global Dispatches (1996)
 Blood Lite (2008)
 Blood Lite II: Overbite (2011)
 The Nebula Awards Showcase 2011 (2011)
 Blood Lite III: Aftertaste (2012)
 Five by Five 3: Target Zone (2014)

Short fiction

Collections
Dogged Persistence (Golden Gryphon Press, 2001)
18 stories: Canals in the Sand, Dogged Persistence, Drumbeats, Dune: A Whisper of Caladan Seas, Entropy Ranch, Final Performance, Fondest of Memories, The Ghost of Christmas Always, Human, Martian - One, Two, Three, Much at Stake, Music Played on the Strings of Time, New Recruits, The Old Man and the Cherry Tree, Prisoner of War, Reflections in a Magnetic Mirror, Scientific Romance, Sea Dreams, Tide Pools
Landscapes

See also
 :Category:Novels by Kevin J. Anderson

References 

Bibliographies by writer
Bibliographies of American writers
Science fiction bibliographies